In Greek mythology, Phoroneus (Ancient Greek: Φορωνεύς means 'bringer of a price') was a culture-hero of the Argolid, fire-bringer, law giver, and primordial king of Argos.

Family 
Phoroneus was the son of the river god Inachus and either Melia, the Oceanid or Argia, the embodiment of the Argolid itself:  "Inachus, son of Oceanus, begat Phoroneus by his sister Argia".

He was said to have been married to Cinna, or Cerdo, a nymph, or Teledice (or Laodice) also a nymph, or Perimede, or first to Peitho and second to Europe, and to have fathered a number of children including Apis, Car, Chthonia, Clymenus, Sparton, Lyrcus and Europs, an illegitimate son. An unnamed daughter of his is said to have consorted with Hecaterus and thus became the mother of the five Hecaterides, nymphs of the rustic dance.

According to Hellanicus of Lesbos, Phoroneus had at least three sons: Agenor, Jasus and Pelasgus. After the death of Phoroneus, the two elder brothers divided his dominions, Pelasgus received the country about the river Erasmus, and built Larissa, and Iasus the country about Elis. After the death of these two, Agenor, the youngest, invaded their dominions, and thus became king of Argos.

The Clementine Recognitions mentions Phthia, a daughter of Phoroneus, who became the mother of Achaeus by Zeus.

Reign 
Hyginus' genealogy expresses the position of Phoroneus as one of the primordial men, whose local identities differed in the various regions of Greece, and who had for a mother the essential spirit of the very earth of Argos herself, Argia. He was the primordial king in the Peloponnesus, authorized by Zeus: "Formerly Zeus himself had ruled over men, but Hermes created a confusion of human speech, which spoiled Zeus' pleasure in this Rule". Phoroneus introduced both the worship of Hera and the use of fire and the forge. Poseidon and Hera had vied for the Argive when the primeval waters had receded, Phoroneus "was the first to gather the people together into a community; for they had up to then been living as scattered and lonesome families". (Pausanias).

Phoroneus' successor was Argus, who was Niobe's son, either by Zeus or Phoroneus himself. He was also the father of Apis, who may have also ruled Argos (according to Tatiānus). He was worshipped in Argos with an eternal fire that was shown to Pausanias in the 2nd century CE, and funeral sacrifices were offered to him at his tomb-sanctuary. 
He is also credited as the founder of law.

Argive genealogy

Notes

References 

 Apollodorus, The Library with an English Translation by Sir James George Frazer, F.B.A., F.R.S. in 2 Volumes, Cambridge, MA, Harvard University Press; London, William Heinemann Ltd. 1921. ISBN 0-674-99135-4. Online version at the Perseus Digital Library. Greek text available from the same website.
Gaius Julius Hyginus, Fabulae from The Myths of Hyginus translated and edited by Mary Grant. University of Kansas Publications in Humanistic Studies. Online version at the Topos Text Project.
 Parthenius, Love Romances translated by Sir Stephen Gaselee (1882-1943), S. Loeb Classical Library Volume 69. Cambridge, MA. Harvard University Press. 1916.  Online version at the Topos Text Project.
 Parthenius, Erotici Scriptores Graeci, Vol. 1. Rudolf Hercher. in aedibus B. G. Teubneri. Leipzig. 1858. Greek text available at the Perseus Digital Library.
 Pausanias, Description of Greece with an English Translation by W.H.S. Jones, Litt.D., and H.A. Ormerod, M.A., in 4 Volumes. Cambridge, MA, Harvard University Press; London, William Heinemann Ltd. 1918. . Online version at the Perseus Digital Library
Pausanias, Graeciae Descriptio. 3 vols. Leipzig, Teubner. 1903.  Greek text available at the Perseus Digital Library.
 Pseudo-Clement, Recognitions from Ante-Nicene Library Volume 8, translated by Smith, Rev. Thomas. T. & T. Clark, Edinburgh. 1867. Online version at theio.com
 Strabo, The Geography of Strabo. Edition by H.L. Jones. Cambridge, Mass.: Harvard University Press; London: William Heinemann, Ltd. 1924. Online version at the Perseus Digital Library.
 Strabo, Geographica edited by A. Meineke. Leipzig: Teubner. 1877. Greek text available at the Perseus Digital Library.

External links 

Mahanas, Dictionary of Greek Mythology; "Phoroneus"
Greek mythological heroes
Princes in Greek mythology
Kings of Argos
Kings in Greek mythology
Children of Inachus
Argive characters in Greek mythology
Deeds of Zeus
Mythology of Argos